Gransden Lodge Airfield is a former wartime airfield located  west of Cambridge, Cambridgeshire, England.

The Cambridge University Gliding Club (now Cambridge Gliding Centre) moved to Gransden Lodge in October 1991, having previously shared Duxford Airfield with the Imperial War Museum Duxford.

History
Gransden Lodge opened in April 1942 as an operational RAF Bomber Command station called RAF Gransden Lodge with three concrete runways. At the end of 1945 the airfield was transferred to Transport Command but the last operational squadron was disbanded in February 1946.  The RAF station closed in 1955 and it was also used for some motor races, including the first major postwar motor race in the UK on 15 June 1946.

Operational units

Units
The following units were here at some point:

Current use

The Cambridge Gliding Centre now uses the airfield.

References

Citations

Bibliography

External links

Wartime information
Gransden Lodge Airfield history
Cambridge Gliding Centre

Airports in England
Airports in the East of England
Defunct motorsport venues in England
Gliderports in the United Kingdom
Gliding in England
Transport in Cambridgeshire